James "Jimmy" R. Coe (March 20, 1921 – February 26, 2004) was an American jazz saxophonist.

Early life
Coe was born in Tompkinsville, Kentucky, and moved to Indianapolis with his family as a child. He first played in a band with Erroll "Groundhog" Grandy, who mentored J. J. Johnson and Wes Montgomery.

Career 
From 1938 to 1940, Coe performed with Buddy Bryant's band and by the age of 20, was already touring with the Jay McShann band, which included Charlie Parker, Al Hibbler, Walter Brown, Bernard Anderson, Gene Ramey and Doc West.

In the 1950s, Coe recorded for King as a member of Tiny Bradshaw's band, then made a session with his own combo (though the company oddly insisted on billing him as Jimmy "Cole.") In 1953, States recorded his Gay Cats of Rhythm. In the late 1950s, Coe led the house band for the small Indianapolis-based label Note Records; some of the material was licensed to Checker, which had better distribution.

Coe backed performers including Aretha Franklin, Roy Hamilton, and Gladys Knight & the Pips. Other musicians he worked with included Montgomery, Slide Hampton, David Baker, Freddie Hubbard, pianist Carl Perkins, Larry Ridley, Leroy Vinnegar, and doo-wop performers, The Students.

Personal life 
Coe died in Indianapolis in 2004, at the age of 82.

References

1921 births
2004 deaths
American jazz composers
American male jazz composers
American jazz saxophonists
American male saxophonists
Delmark Records artists
20th-century American saxophonists
20th-century American composers
20th-century American male musicians
20th-century jazz composers
People from Tompkinsville, Kentucky
Musicians from Indianapolis
Musicians from Indiana